Parahypochaeta is a genus of bristle flies in the family Tachinidae.

Species
Parahypochaeta genalis (Townsend, 1927)
Parahypochaeta heteroneura Brauer & von Bergenstamm, 1891

References

Diptera of South America
Dexiinae
Tachinidae genera
Monotypic Brachycera genera
Taxa named by Friedrich Moritz Brauer
Taxa named by Julius von Bergenstamm